Troughton Island is an island located off the Kimberley coast of Western Australia, about  north-west of  Kalumburu and  north-west of the Mungalalu Truscott Airbase.

History
The island was found and named in 1819 by Phillip Parker King. The Sir Graham Moore Islands
Airline company ShoreAir Pty Ltd has opened and operated an airport on the island since the 1960s.
It is a reference point for hydrographic surveys.

Climate
Under the Köppen climate classification, Troughton Island has a hot semi-arid climate (BSh), bordering on a tropical savanna climate, with a sweltering and oppressively humid wet season from December to March and a hotdry season from April to November.

References

Islands of the Kimberley (Western Australia)